Atchison County is the northwesternmost county in the U.S. state of Missouri. As of the 2020 census, the county had a population of 5,305. Its county seat is Rock Port. It was originally known as Allen County when it was detached from Holt County in 1843. The county was officially organized on February 14, 1845, and named for U.S. Senator David Rice Atchison from Missouri.

Geography

Atchison's western boundary for the most part is the Missouri River and Nebraska.  An 1867 flood straightened a bend in the river north of Watson.  Both Nebraska and Missouri claimed the 5,000 acre McKissick Island that extends almost two miles into Atchison County.  The Supreme Court in 1904 decided that the land belongs to Nebraska.  The only way Nebraskans can reach it by road is to cross the Missouri River and then travel through Missouri.

The State Line Slough (Missouri) stream is in Atchison County.

Adjacent counties
Fremont County, Iowa  (north)
Page County, Iowa  (northeast)
Nodaway County  (east)
Holt County  (south)
Richardson County, Nebraska  (southwest)
Nemaha County, Nebraska  (west)
Otoe County, Nebraska  (northwest)

Major highways
Interstate 29
U.S. Route 59
U.S. Route 136
U.S. Route 275
Route 46
Route 111

Demographics

As of the census of 2000, there were 6,430 people, 2,722 households, and 1,777 families residing in the county.  The population density was 12 people per square mile (5/km2).  There were 3,103 housing units at an average density of 6 per square mile (2/km2).  The racial makeup of the county was 97.00% White, 2.05% Black or African American, 0.19% Native American, 0.14% Asian, 0.31% from other races, and 0.31% from two or more races. Approximately 0.67% of the population were Hispanic or Latino of any race.

There were 2,722 households, out of which 26.60% had children under the age of 18 living with them, 55.80% were married couples living together, 6.10% had a female householder with no husband present, and 34.70% were non-families. 31.50% of all households were made up of individuals, and 17.60% had someone living alone who was 65 years of age or older.  The average household size was 2.25 and the average family size was 2.82.

In the county, the population was spread out, with 24.10% under the age of 18, 6.50% from 18 to 24, 24.20% from 25 to 44, 24.20% from 45 to 64, and 21.10% who were 65 years of age or older.  The median age was 42 years. For every 100 females there were 99.30 males.  For every 100 females age 18 and over, there were 91.90 males.

The median income for a household in the county was $30,959, and the median income for a family was $38,279. Males had a median income of $27,468 versus $18,855 for females. The per capita income for the county was $16,956.  About 9.30% of families and 11.60% of the population were below the poverty line, including 13.70% of those under age 18 and 12.40% of those age 65 or over.

Religion
According to the Association of Religion Data Archives County Membership Report (2010), Atchison County is sometimes regarded as being on the northern edge of the Bible Belt, although mainline Protestantism is the most predominant religion. The most predominant denominations among residents in Atchison County who adhere to a religion are United Methodists (29.93%), Lutherans (LCMC) (22.16%), and Southern Baptists (14.33%).

2020 census

Education

Public Schools
Fairfax R-III School District – Fairfax
Fairfax Elementary School (PK-06)
Fairfax High School (07-12)
Rock Port R-II School District – Rock Port
Rock Port Elementary School (K-06)
Rock Port High School (07-12)
Tarkio R-I School District – Tarkio
Tarkio Elementary School (PK-06)
Tarkio High School (07-12)

Private Schools
Tarkio Academy – Tarkio (07-12) – Nonsectarian (All Boys) - closed

Public Libraries
Atchison County Library

Politics

Local
The Republican Party controls politics at the local level in Atchison County. Republicans hold all but two of the elected positions in the county.

State

All of Atchison County is a part of Missouri's 1st District in the Missouri House of Representatives and is represented by  Allen Andrews (R-Grant City).

All of Atchison County is a part of Missouri's 12th District in the Missouri Senate and is currently represented by Dan Hegeman (R-Cosby).

Federal
All of Atchison County is included in Missouri's 6th Congressional District and is currently represented by Sam Graves (R-Tarkio) in the U.S. House of Representatives. Graves was elected to an eleventh term in 2020 over Democratic challenger Gena Ross.

Atchison County, along with the rest of the state of Missouri, is represented in the U.S. Senate by Josh Hawley (R-Columbia) and Roy Blunt (R-Strafford).

Blunt was elected to a second term in 2016 over then-Missouri Secretary of State Jason Kander.

Political culture

At the presidential level, Atchison County is solidly Republican. Atchison County strongly favored Donald Trump in both 2016 and 2020. Bill Clinton was the last Democratic presidential nominee to carry Atchison County in 1992 with a plurality of the vote, and a Democrat hasn't won majority support from the county's voters in a presidential election since Lyndon Johnson in 1964.

Like most rural areas throughout northwest Missouri, voters in Atchison County generally adhere to socially and culturally conservative principles which tend to influence their Republican leanings. In 2018, Missourians voted on a proposition (Proposition A) concerning right to work, the outcome of which ultimately reversed the right to work legislation passed in the state the previous year. However, 57.61% of Atchison County voters cast their ballots to keep the law.

Missouri presidential preference primaries

2020
The 2020 presidential primaries for both the Democratic and Republican parties were held in Missouri on March 10. On the Democratic side, former Vice President Joe Biden (D-Delaware) both won statewide and carried Atchison County by a wide margin. Biden went on to defeat President Donald Trump in the general election.

Incumbent President Donald Trump (R-Florida) faced a primary challenge from former Massachusetts Governor Bill Weld, but won both Atchison County and statewide by large margins.

2016
The 2016 presidential primaries for both the Republican and Democratic parties were held in Missouri on March 15. Businessman Donald Trump (R-New York) narrowly won the state overall and carried a plurality of the vote in Atchison County. He went on to win the presidency.

On the Democratic side, Senator Bernie Sanders (I-Vermont) carried Atchison County, but former Secretary of State Hillary Clinton (D-New York) won statewide by a small margin. Clinton won the nomination that year.

2012
The 2012 Missouri Republican Presidential Primary's results were nonbinding on the state's national convention delegates. Voters in Atchison County supported former U.S. Senator Rick Santorum (R-Pennsylvania), who finished first in the state at large, but eventually lost the nomination to former Governor Mitt Romney (R-Massachusetts). Delegates to the congressional district and state conventions were chosen at a county caucus, which selected a delegation favoring Santorum. Incumbent President Barack Obama easily won the Missouri Democratic Primary and renomination. He defeated Romney in the general election.

2008
In 2008, the Missouri Republican Presidential Primary was closely contested, with Senator John McCain (R-Arizona) prevailing and eventually winning the nomination.

Then-Senator Hillary Clinton (D-New York) received more votes than any candidate from either party in Atchison County during the 2008 presidential primary. Despite initial reports that Clinton had won Missouri, Barack Obama (D-Illinois), also a Senator at the time, narrowly defeated her statewide and later became that year's Democratic nominee, going on to win the presidency.

Communities

Cities
Fairfax
Rock Port (county seat)
Tarkio
Westboro

Village
Watson

Unincorporated communities

 Blanchard
 Dotham
 Langdon
 Linden
 Milton
 Phelps City
 York

Townships
Atchison County is divided into 11 townships:

Notable people
 Michael J. Burg - Actor
 Zel Fischer - Missouri Supreme Court Justice
 Sam Graves - U.S. Representative for Missouri's 6th Congressional District

See also
National Register of Historic Places listings in Atchison County, Missouri

References

External links
 Digitized 1930 Plat Book of Atchison County  from University of Missouri Division of Special Collections, Archives, and Rare Books

 
Missouri counties
Missouri counties on the Missouri River
1845 establishments in Missouri
Populated places established in 1845